Olearia speciosa is a species of flowering plant in the family Asteraceae and is endemic to Victoria in Australia. It is a straggly, open shrub with egg-shaped to elliptic leaves, and white and yellow or brownish, daisy-like inflorescences.

Description
The edges of the leaves have irregular teeth and the lower surface is densely woolly-hairy.

Taxonomy
Olearia speciosa was first formally described in 1907 by John Hutchinson in The Botanical Magazine from plants raised from seed collected in the Botanic Gardens, Melbourne in 1888. The specific epithet (speciosa) means "showy".

Distribution and habitat
This olearia grows in scattered locations in cool, moist forest in southern Victoria.

Conservation status
Olearia speciosa is listed as "poorly known in Victoria" on the Department of Sustainability and Environment's Advisory List of Rare Or Threatened Plants In Victoria.

References

speciosa
Asterales of Australia
Flora of Victoria (Australia)
Plants described in 1907